Lucas Mata (born 8 July 1988) is an Australian bobsledder. He competed at the FIBT World Championships 2012 in Lake Placid, and the FIBT World Championships 2013 in St. Moritz. He competed at the 2014 Winter Olympics in Sochi, in four-man bobsleigh. After the Olympics, his brakeman was Simon Dunn.

References 

1988 births
Living people
Bobsledders at the 2014 Winter Olympics
Bobsledders at the 2018 Winter Olympics
Australian male bobsledders
Olympic bobsledders of Australia